The orders, decorations, and medals of Luxembourg have their foundation in the Duchy of Nassau.  The top tier order of Luxembourg being the Order of the Gold Lion of the House of Nassau is the House Order of the House of Nassau.  The next in the order of honours precedence is the Order of Adolphe of Nassau, was founded by Adolphe, Grand Duke of Luxembourg, in 1858 while he was the last reigning Duke of Nassau.

Orders
 Order of the Gold Lion of the House of Nassau
 Order of Adolphe of Nassau
 Order of Merit of the Grand Duchy of Luxembourg
 Order of the Oak Crown
 Order of the Resistance
 National Order of the Medal of Merit for Sport

Military decorations

 Military Medal
 Cross of Honour and Military Merit
 War Cross
 1914-18 Volunteers Medal
 1940-45 Volunteers Medal
 Volunteer Long Service Cross
 Military Merit Veterans Medal

Civil decorations
 Badge of the Resistance
 National Medal of Recognition
 Medal of Merit for Blood Donation
 Medal of Merit for Civil Defense
 Service Cross for Customs Officers
 Service Cross for Prison Guards
 Service Cross for Water and Forest Officers

Commemorative medals
 Golden Wedding Medal 1901
 Commemorative Medal 1953
 Jubilee Medal 1981 HRH Henri and Maria Teresa  (referring to the matrimonial union of the then Hereditary Grand Duke (since 2000 reigning Grand Duke) and his wife.)
 Grand Duke Jean Silver Jubilee Medal 1989

See also
 List of honours of Luxembourg awarded to heads of state and royalty

References

External links

 Medals of the World, Orders, Decorations and Medals of Luxembourg
 DISTINCTIONS HONORIFIQUES (French)